Scott Lake, Scotts Lake, Lake Scott, or Scotty Lake may refer to:

People
Scott A. Lake, Champion U.S. racehorse trainer

Inhabited places
Scott Lake, Florida, a census-designated place in Miami-Dade County, Florida

Lakes

Australia
Lake Scott, in Tasmania

Canada

Scott Lake (Canada), bordering Saskatchewan and the Northwest Territories

British Columbia
Scott Lake, in Peace River Regional District

New Brunswick
Scott Lake, in Kings County, New Brunswick

Nova Scotia
Scotts Lake, in Digby County, Nova Scotia
Scott Lake, in Halifax County, Nova Scotia
Scott Lake, in Queens County, Nova Scotia
Scotts Lake, in Yarmouth County, Nova Scotia

Russian Federation

озеро Скотта (transliteration: ozero Skotta, translation: Lake of Scott), in Krasnodar Krai, Southern Federal District

United States

Alaska
Scotty Lake, in Denali
Scott Lake, in Matanuska-Susitna Borough, Alaska
Scotty Lake, in Matanuska-Susitna Borough, Alaska

Arkansas
Scott Lake, in Bradley County, Arkansas
Scotty Lake, in Howard County, Arkansas
Scott Lake, in Little River County, Arkansas
Scott Lake, in Miller County, Arkansas

California
Scotts Lake, in El Dorado County, California
Scott Lake, in Siskiyou County, California

Colorado
Scott Lake, in Pitkin County, Colorado

Florida
Lake Scott, in Orange County, Florida
Scott Lake, in Polk County, Florida

Georgia
Scott Lake, in Baldwin County, Georgia
Scott Lake, in Gordon County, Georgia
Scotts Lake, in Henry County, Georgia
Scott Lake, in Thomas County, Georgia
Scott Lake, in Walker County, Georgia

Illinois
Scott Lake, in Saint Clair County, Illinois

Kansas
Lake Scott, in Lake Scott State Park

Michigan
Scott Lake, in Dickinson County, Michigan
Scott Lake, in Iron County, Michigan
Scott Lake, in Kent County, Michigan
Scott Lake (Waterford Township, Michigan), in Oakland County

Minnesota
Scotts Lake, in Antrim County, Michigan
Scott Lake, in Carver County, Minnesota
Scott Lake, in Crow Wing County, Minnesota
Scott Lake (Grant County, Minnesota)
Scott Lake, a lake in Hannepin County
Scott Lake, in Lake County, Minnesota
Scott Lake, in Saint Lewis County
Scott Lake, in Wright County, Minnesota

Mississippi
Scott Lake, in Pontotoc County, Mississippi
Scott Lake, in Warren County, Mississippi

Missouri
Scott Lake, in Boone County, Missouri
Scott Lake, in Cole County, Missouri

Montana
Scott Lake, in Beaverhead County, Montana
Scott Lake, in Flathead County, Montana

New York
Scott Lake, in Washington County, New York

North Carolina
Lake Scott, see W. Kerr Scott Dam and Reservoir
Scott Lake, in Stokes County, North Carolina
Scotts Lake, in Wilson County, North Carolina

North Dakota
Scotts Lake, in Barnes County, North Dakota

Oregon
Scott Lake, in Lake County, Oregon

South Carolina
Scotts Lake, in Aiken County, South Carolina
Scott Lake, in Florence County, South Carolina

South Dakota
Scott Lake (South Dakota), in Aurora County

Tennessee
Scott Lake, in Chester County, Tennessee

Texas
Scott Lake, in Bexar County, Texas
Lake Scott, in Childress County, Texas
Scott Lake, in Lavaca County, Texas
Scott Lake, in Montgomery County, Texas
Scott Lake, in Young County, Texas

Washington
Scott Lake (Washington), Thurston County

West Virginia
Scott Lake, in Randolph County, West Virginia

Wisconsin
Scott Lake, in Barron County, Wisconsin
Scott Lake, in Douglas County, Wisconsin
Scott Lake, in Forest County, Wisconsin
Scott Lake, in Sawyer County, Wisconsin

Wyoming
Scott Lake, a lake in Sublette County